Lovejoy Fountain Park (or Lovejoy Plaza) is a city park in downtown Portland, Oregon, U.S.

Description and history
Completed in 1966, the park was designed by American landscape architect Lawrence Halprin. The park was the first in a series of fountains and open space designed by Halprin in the South Auditorium District urban renewal area. The stark concrete contours of the park are bounded by tree-lined pedestrian malls that connect to other parks, including Keller Fountain Park. The park is named in honor of Asa Lovejoy, one of the first landowners of the Portland town site.

In addition to the fountain, the park also features a large copper-clad pavilion designed by Halprin's collaborator, American architect Charles Willard Moore.

Shortly after opening, Life Magazine published a three-page pictorial Mid-City Mountain Stream which described the park as a "piece of wilderness transplanted—wet and dry, glittering and static—which effectively invites wading and clambering and contemplation."

The Halprin Landscape Conservancy was formed in 2001 to "spruce up and protect Lovejoy Plaza, Ira Keller Fountain, and Pettygrove Park, an ensemble considered to be one of Mr. Halprin's masterpieces."

See also 
 Fountains in Portland, Oregon
 List of parks in Portland, Oregon

References

External links 

 Portland Parks & Rec Lovejoy Park

1966 establishments in Oregon
Fountains in Portland, Oregon
Parks in Portland, Oregon
Protected areas established in 1966
Southwest Portland, Oregon
Urban public parks